Sencer Sarı (born 15 March 1982) is a Turkish ceramicist, sculptor, ceramic & glass technology expert, and academic researcher.

Academic activity

Sencer Sarı started his studies in Çanakkale On Sekiz Mart University, Faculty of Fine Arts, Department of Ceramic between 2002 and 2006 and later attended the same university for his master's degree between 2007 and 2010 where he completed his master's degree in the Department of Ceramics, Çanakkale 18 Mart University in 2010 where his master's thesis project "Low-temperature Chromated Glazes" was published under Scientific Research Projects. It was during this time during his studies, he focused on artistic ceramic forms along with experimental ceramic technology supporting these forms. In 2006, Sarı worked at Civelek Porselen ceramic and diamond research laboratory with Osman Nuri Civelek on sinter, alkaline metals and ceramic matrix composites where he participated in research and development of domestic manufacturing of refractory armor and sintered alumina supported ballistic vests. Sarı has also worked with experimental ceramicist/sculptor İbrahim Tayfun Durat between 2005 and 2009 on low-temperature glazed and chromated glazes.

In 2013, S. Sarı completed his Ph.D. degree at the Department of Ceramics and Glass, National Art Academy in Sofia, Bulgaria with the thesis titled "reaching copper-red glazes in low-temperature and oxygenated atmosphere". Sarı has resumed his technological research during his Ph.D. studies where he developed "smoke-free reduction techniques" in electric ovens and interior places by reduction of petroleum. With this new method, the artist achieved to provide copper red color difficult to provide in ceramic technology. S. Sarı is also a member of the International Association Of Art Turkish National Committee UNESCO AIAP, since 2007. 2014 September to 2016 February he worked as a Lecturer in Marmara University Faculty Of Fine Arts, Ceramic and Glass Department. 2016 to Present Dr. Sari is working as an Expert witness for Republic of Turkey Ministry of Justice February 2019 Dr. Sari accepted as an Invited Professor Doctor. at The Tbilisi State Academy of Arts, Faculty of Design, Department of Artistic Ceramic.

Since 2011 S. Sarı has been working on creating ceramics works that take advantage of the glow properties of radioactive uranium silicates. Sarı has been working with technology and art in parallel implementing works of art by using the techniques of uranium silicate's phosphorus effects on porcelain bodies since 2011. According to Sarı, there are two shades of red (copper red and uranium red) that are very difficult to achieve in glaze and ceramics and that a small surface of uranium red can be produced by burning uranium nitrate in high temperature. He was able to experiment with radioactive rare elements during his PhD studies in Sofia and that he was able to successfully significantly reduce alpha particle radiation from glaze and ceramics using radioactive uranium by using lead and lithium oxide layer coating which is further coated by glass layers. On 30 November 2012 Sarı held a seminar on "Uranium in Ceramic Art" at Vuzf University and also held a solo exhibition demonstrating this work with red uranium. On 27 June 2012 Sarı gave a guest lecture and held a workshop on uses of rare elements in ceramic glazes and glass bodies, cromatic glazes, Turkish blue glaze, preparation of safety fluoric acid bath for mat glazing at University of Applied Arts Vienna. On 15 September 2012 Sarı presented his paper with the topic "Uses of The Rare Elements into Ceramic Glazes and Glass Bodies" in the Sixth International Eskişehir Terra Cotta Symposium where he discussed the behavior within glazed ceramic/porcelain bodies of attained rare earth elements. At 29 November 2016 Dr Sari made a solo seminar with workshop about U/V Glow Ceramic Glazes & Uranium Glass at Vilnius Academy of Arts Lithuania On 8 February 2017 Dr.Sari opened the XXIII Annual Expert PhD seminar "Inorganic Non-metallic Materials" at the University of Chemical Technology, department of Glass and Ceramics in Prague, Czech Republic. In this seminar he presented his personal research "Uranium Compounds in Art".

Art activity

On 2 May 2006, "Aqua" by Sarı was awarded the Şima Art Special Award in 9th Rotary International Golden Jug Ceramic Contest at İzmir Art and Sculpture Museum and Gallery and was exhibited until 14 May. Between 1 and 20 November 2006 Sarı participated in the mixed exhibition 5th Smoke Firing Ceramic Workshop held at İzmir Adnan Franko Art Gallery. On 12 September 2007 Sarı held his first solo exhibition titled "Masks & Sensations" (Turkish: Duyumlar ve Maskeler) at UNESCO – AIAP International Plastic Arts Association Gallery, Istanbul. Later that year on 27 October he had participated in two separate group exhibitions titled Mediterranean Sea & Homesickness (Turkish: Akdenizlilik ve Gurbet) by UNESCO AIAP and mixed group exhibition by Turkish Collective Artists’ Union at 2007 Tüyap Artist Art Fair.

On 30 November 2012 Sarı held a seminar on Uranium in Ceramic Art at Vuzf University and also held a solo exhibition at Vuzf University exhibition hall with an "Anemones in Red" theme demonstrating his work with red uranium. Between 20 October and 7 November 2014 he held a solo exhibition with the title "From the Sea" (Turkish: Denizden Gelenler) at Tünel Art Gallery, Istanbul. Between 8 and 16 November 2014 Sarı participated as a part of the Collective Artists’ Union exhibition titled "So as not to forget" (Turkish: Unutmamak İçin) in the 24th Istanbul Art Fair held at TÜYAP Fair and Convention Center, Istanbul. 16 August 2017 S. Sari attended the 5th International Ceramic Art Symposium Ceramic Laboratory in Daugavpils, Latvia. 14 August – 15 September 2017 S. Sari held an outdoor solo ceramic exhibition "Luminescent fairies" in Vilnius, Lithuania. 14–16 September 2018 S. Sari had a successful solo porcelain exhibition "Decadence Now"  in Akhaltsikhe, Georgia 4 September 2019 Prof. Sari invited to Art Fest Ceramic Alchemy  for ceramic technology seminar.

Patented researches 
 30 07 2015  (Patent/Application Number: TUR 2015/09482) Reduction Agents in Reduction Firing with Electrical Kiln and Firing Methodology for Reduction Agents
 02 02 2016 (Patent/Application Number: TUR 2016/01448) Portable Melting Kiln

Bibliography
 
 
 Fokus Magazine - No:43 (May - June 2014) page 48,49,50 - .
 
 Low temperature copper red glazes produced through reduction in oxygen atmosphere. 2015. –  
Protection of Glaze Core Stability in Macro Crystalline Glazes. 2019 - ACADEMIA 7 - ISSN 1512-0899

References

1982 births
Living people
Turkish ceramists
21st-century ceramists
Artists from Istanbul